Hiranagar Assembly constituency is one of the 87 constituencies in the Jammu and Kashmir Legislative Assembly of Jammu and Kashmir a north Indian union territory. Hiranagar is also part of Jammu Lok Sabha constituency.

Member of Legislative Assembly
 1977: Girdhari Lal Dogra, Indian National Congress
 1980: Baldev Singh, Bharatiya Janata Party
 1983: Ram Dass, Indian National Congress
 1987: Baldev Singh, Bharatiya Janata Party 
 1996: Prem Lal, Bharatiya Janata Party
 2002: Girdhari Lal Dogra, Indian National Congress
 2008: Durga Dass, Bharatiya Janata Party

Election results

2014

See also
 Hiranagar
 Kathua district
 List of constituencies of Jammu and Kashmir Legislative Assembly

References

Assembly constituencies of Jammu and Kashmir
Kathua district